Zadok (or Zadok HaKohen, also spelled Ṣadok, Ṣadoc, Zadoq, Tzadok, or Tsadoq; , meaning "Righteous, Justified") was a Kohen (priest), biblically recorded to be a descendant from Eleazar the son of Aaron. He was the High Priest of Israel during the reigns of David and Solomon. He aided King David during the revolt of his son Absalom, was subsequently instrumental in bringing Solomon to the throne and officiated at Solomon's coronation. After Solomon's building of the First Temple in Jerusalem, Zadok was the first High Priest to serve there.

The prophet Ezekiel extols in the book attributed to him the sons of Zadok as staunch opponents of paganism during the era of pagan worship and indicates their birthright to unique duties and privileges in the future temple.

Hebrew Bible 
The Tanakh (Hebrew Bible) states that Zadok was a patrilineal descendant of Eleazar the son of Aaron the high priest. (2 Samuel 8:17; 1 Chronicles 24:3) The lineage of Zadok is presented in the genealogy of Ezra (his descendant) as being of ninth generation of direct patrilineal descent from Phineas the son of Eleazar; Ezra 7:1, see 1 Chronicles 6:4–8 where he is placed eighth in descent from Phineas.

In the biblical narrative, Zadok is first mentioned as coming to support David at Hebron. During the rebellion of Absalom, Zadok is mentioned, as he and the Levites wished to accompany the fleeing David and bring along the Ark of the Covenant, but the king instructed Zadok to remain at Jerusalem, where he and Abiathar could do him better service, so that it actually happened that Ahimaaz, the son of Zadok, along with Jonathan, the son of Abiathar, brought the fleeing king a life saving message. In all these passages Zadok is mentioned in precedence to Abiathar. Zadok was also chief officer over the Aaronites. The term high priest is not used in the Hebrew scriptures from the time of Joshua until the reign of Joash.

Both Zadok and Ahimelech were functioning in tandem as priests at the time of David's hasty exit from Jerusalem. When David first set up his cabinet, Zadok and Ahimelech, the son of Abiathar, were named as priests. After the Absalom rebellion, David rearranged his cabinet and replaced Ahimelech with his father Abiathar as the second priest to Zadok. This was probably due to Abiathar's support during the Absalom rebellion. Why Ahimelech was removed as the second priest is not told. Subsequently, when Adonijah endeavored to secure the throne, Abiathar sided with him, leading king Solomon (David's son) to expel him from Jerusalem and reinforce the sole chief-priesthood of Zadok, who, along with Nathan the Prophet, supported King Solomon's accession to throne.

In  Zadok is named as the leader of the priests who served "before the tabernacle of the Lord at the high place that was at Gibeon", although he is later recorded as working alongside Ahimelech devising a schedule of priestly service to support David's preparations for the construction of the Temple in Jerusalem.

Anointing Solomon 

According to 1 Kings 1:39, Zadok officiated at the anointing ceremony of Solomon as king.

The Bible records how before his death, Aaron was accompanied by his brother Moses and his son Eleazar. Upon entry to the cave where he was to die, Aaron saw his brother Moses dress his elder son Eleazar with the clothes of the high priesthood, as initiation to high priesthood. Jewish commentaries on the Bible say that this initiation ceremony served as the catalyst for the stipulation that all future candidates of high priesthood be patrilineal descendants of Eleazar the elder son of Aaron and not Ithamar, the younger son.

Similarly, the Bible relates how, at the time Phineas son of Eleazar appeased God's anger, he merited the divine blessing of God:

In addition, the Bible records:

Dead Sea Scrolls 
The Dead Sea Scrolls portray a central role for "the sons of Zadok the Priest" within the community; the "Teacher of Righteousness" (Moreh Zedek) named as founder may point to a Zadokite. while the phrase "To be as one in following the Law and (sharing) wealth and reconciling (based on) the mouth of the sons of Tzadok the keepers of the covenant" from the Community Rule document suggest that the leaders of the community were (or were considered to be) descendants of Zadok.

In rabbinic literature

Phineas/Ithamar controversy
Rabbinic commentators explain that the continuity of high priesthood is put forth to the descendants of Phineas from this noted verse. According to some rabbinic commentators Phineas sinned due to his not availing his servitude of Torah instruction to the masses at the time leading up to the Battle of Gibeah. In addition, he also failed to address the needs of relieving Jephthah of his vow. As consequence, the high priesthood was taken from him and given (temporarily, see next section) to the offspring of Ithamar, essentially Eli and his sons.

Priesthood transition 
Upon the sin of Eli's sons, Hophni and Phinehas, it was prophesied that the high priesthood would be returned to the sons of Eleazar:

A number of scholars indicate that Zadok was the subject of the prophecy to Eli when Zadok, said to be of the progeny of Eleazar, was ultimately appointed as high priest.

Zadok, as a patrilineal descendant of Phinehas (son of Eleazar) assumed the high priesthood. His sons were Ahimaaz and Azariah followed by his descendants who held the high priesthood up to the destruction of the First Temple and, following the building of the second temple, resumed the high priesthood, as per Joshua the High Priest (along with Ezra) being of Sons of Zadok lineage.

The attempt to trace his genealogy back to Eleazar, the third son of Aaron, as opposed to Abiathar, his contemporary and colleague, who was regarded as a descendant of Eli and considered a member of the house of Ithamar, was first made by the Chronicler (I Chronicles 5:30–34 [A. V. vi. 4–8]; comp. 6:35–38 [A. V. 6:50–53]), thus assuring the preeminence of the Zadokites over the descendants of Eli. In the beginning of his career he was associated with Abiathar (2 Samuel 20:25) and with his son (ib. 8:17; I Chron. 24:3, 6, 31). The hypothesis has accordingly been advanced that Zadok officiated in the Tabernacle at Gibeon (I Chron. 16:39; comp. I Kings 3:4), while the sons of Eli were stationed as high priests at Jerusalem or, more probably, at Shiloh (compare Keil on I Kings 1:8) Such a division of functions is very doubtful, however; and it is more plausible to suppose that Zadok gradually won equality of rank with the sons of Eli by his good fortune in gaining the favor of David.

According to the Chronicler, a certain Zadok, as a young man, had been one of those who joined David at Hebron and helped him win the crown of all Israel, his house then including twenty-two captains; (I Chron 12:29)  and Josephus expressly identifies this Zadok with the high priest of the same name (Antiquities of the Jews 7:2, § 2).

According to the Masoretic Hebrew text, David addressed the priest with the words "ha-Kohen ha-ro'eh attah" ("You are the seer-priest") (II Sam. 15:27), and the Vulgate consequently regards Zadok as a seer, although this interpretation is regarded by many scholars as incorrect. These two difficult words are emended by Wellhausen to "ha-Kohen ha-Rosh Atta" ("You are the chief priest"), thus implying the promise of the high priesthood to him. On the suppression of the Absalom rebellion, the king sent Zadok and Abiathar to the elders of Judah, urging them to hasten to bring the monarch back (ib. 19:12) Zadok again manifested his loyalty to the next king when he espoused the cause of Solomon against Adonijah, (I Kings 1:8 et seq.) and in his gratitude Solomon appointed him sole high priest (ib. ii. 35). In his account of this event Josephus states  (Antiquities 8,1, § 3) that Zadok was a scion of the house of Phinehas, and consequently a descendant of Eleazar.

The Zadokite dynasty

History of Zadokites
Historical data show that the high-priesthood remained in the progeny of the Zadokites from the time of Zadok up until the rise of the Hasmoneans, in about 167 BCE. The descendants of Zadok increased in rank and influence, so that his son Azariah was one of the princes of Solomon and Ahimaaz, who married a daughter of Solomon, was probably another of Zadok's sons. Either Zadok himself or his grandson was the ruler of the Aaronite priests, and Jerusha, the mother of Jotham, is apparently termed the daughter of Zadok to emphasize her noble lineage, since her father may have been a descendant of the first Zadok.

The house of Zadok occupied the high priesthood through much of the Second Temple period, from Jehoshua ben Jehozadak after the Exile, down to Simon II (Simon the Just, much praised in Ben Sira 50), his eldest son Onias III, and his usurping second son Jason, who introduced the programme of Hellenisation that eventually led to the Maccabean Revolt.

Josephus records that Onias IV went to Leontopolis in the Egyptian nome of Heliopolis with a significant following, and for lending military support to the Ptolemaic Pharaoh was given land to build a temple to rival the Temple in Jerusalem (although Josephus also ascribes this to Onias III, while dating the project so as to suggest Onias II). It has been suggested that Onias or members of his Zadokite house may have also founded the community at Qumran.

Other theories about Zadok
Some have speculated that as Zadok does not appear in the text of Samuel until after the conquest of Jerusalem, he was actually a Jebusite priest co-opted into the Israelite state religion. Harvard Divinity School Professor Frank Moore Cross refers to this theory as the "Jebusite Hypothesis", criticizes it extensively, but terms it the dominant view among contemporary scholars, in Canaanite Myth and Hebrew Epic: Essays in the History of the Religion of Israel. Further support for the Jebusite Hypothesis may be drawn from Zadok's participation in the conspiracy among native Jerusalemites (i.e., Jebusites), including Nathan and Bathsheba, that displaced the non-Jerusalemite senior heir to King David's throne, Adonijah, in favor of Bathsheba's son Solomon (1 Kings 2:27, 35, 39), thus highjacking the throne and succession for the party of the conspirators.

Elsewhere in the Bible, the Jebusites are described in a manner that suggests that they worshipped the same God (El Elyon) as the Israelites, in the case of Melchizedek. Further support for this theory comes from the fact that other Jebusites or residents of pre-Israelite Jerusalem bore names invoking the principle or god Zedek (Tzedek) (see, for example, the names Melchizedek and Adonizedek). Under this theory the Aaronic lineage ascribed to Zadok is a later, anachronistic interpolation.

Other Zadoks
Zadok or Tzadok, pupil of Antigonus and possibly founder of the Sadducees, construed his teaching, "Be not like the servants who serve their masters for the sake of the wages, but be rather like those who serve without thought of receiving wages" to mean that there is no afterlife. This gives way to the Sadducee connection of Zadok the pupil of Antigonus of Sokho.

Abraham Geiger, was of the opinion that the Sadducee ("Tzadoki" in Mishnaic pronunciation) sect of Judaism drew their name from Zadok, with the leaders of the sect proposed as the sons of Zadok.

However, based on Rabbinic sources, the origination of the Sadducee group initiated in tandem with the Boethusian group, with their founders, Zadok and Boethus, both being individual students of the Antigonus of Sokho, who preceded the Zugot era during the Second Temple period (Avoth deRabbi Nathan 5:2).

Rabbinic literature took a dim view of both the Sadducees and Boethusian groups not only due to their perceived carefree approach to keeping to written Torah and oral Torah law, but also due to their attempts to persuade common-folk to join their ranks (Sifri to Deuteronomy).

Maimonides, in his treatise to Pirkei Avot, views the Sadducees as Gonvei Da'at ("stealers of knowledge") of the greater Jewish nation and of intentionally negating the Rabbinic interpretation of Torah (Torah Shebal Peh Rambam to Avoth chap. 2). Likewise, in his Mishneh Torah treatise the Rambam defines the Sadducees as "Harming Israel and causing the nation to stray from following God" (Hilchoth Avodah Zarah 10:2).

Considering the lack of Rabbinic documentary indicating a connection between Zadok the first high priest and Zadok the student of Antignos of Sokho, along with the 13 plus generations between the two Zadok's, Rabbinic figures tend to put a damper on that association. Additional aspects disproving that association include a Rabbinic mention that the Sadducee and Boethusian groups favored using vessels of gold and silver whereas the common vessel usage of priests, to negate transmission of impurity, were typically of stone.

A Rabbi Zadok is also mentioned as saved in Talmud (Bavli Gittin 56B) by Yohanan ben Zakkai, when he makes his deal with Vespasian. This Zadok is part of the Tannaim teachers that assembled the Mishnah, or Oral Torah ultimately forming the Talmud. This Zadok is listed as Second Generation of five in the Tannaim teacher group, ultimately responsible for the Mishnah used today compiled by Judah I, or Judah the Prince.

Patrilineal Ancestry
As per 1 Chronicles chapter 5

See also
Zadok the Priest (coronation anthem by George Frideric Handel)
List of High Priests of Israel
Zadig

References

10th-century BCE High Priests of Israel
People associated with David
Jebusites
Books of Kings people